Norrtälje Sportcentrum is a football stadium in Norrtälje, Sweden and the home stadium for the football team BKV Norrtälje. Norrtälje Sportcentrum has a total capacity of 1,000 spectators.

References 

Football venues in Sweden